The Victory neighborhood is located within the Camden community of Minneapolis. It is bordered by the Humboldt Industrial Area on the north, Penn Avenue on the east, Dowling Avenue on the south, and the town of Robbinsdale on the west. Victory Memorial Parkway, from which the neighborhood takes its name, runs through the neighborhood and forms part of the western border.

History 

The Victory neighborhood was once home to the many factory and mill workers of north Minneapolis in the early 20th century. After World War I, the city named Victory Memorial Parkway and built upon it a memorial to all local soldiers who died in the World Wars. The Parkway, in addition to serving as a living memorial, has become a center of affluence and culture in North Minneapolis. By contrast with many of the surrounding neighborhoods, Victory residents enjoy a low crime rate and a higher standard of living.

References

External links 

Minneapolis Neighborhood Profile - Victory

Neighborhoods in Minneapolis